Original Concept was an American 1980s hip-hop group from Long Island, New York, best known for their single "Can You Feel It". They only made one album and it was notable for the absence of lyrics on many of the tracks. The group are perhaps better known for their production prowess and instrumentals.

History 
In the early 1980s, a group of young men at WBAU FM formed a group called the "Concept Crew". Their show "The Operating Room" was broadcast on Monday nights from Adelphi University on the same station which featured the Spectrum City DJs (Chuck D and Flavor Flav) who later went on to form Public Enemy. The members were Doctor Dré, T-Money, Rapper G, Easy G. By 1986, the group began calling themselves Original Concept and had released their first record, "Knowledge Me" in February of that year. The B-side of "Knowledge Me" went on to become their first single, "Can You Feel It". The single has since gone on to become one of the most sampled source records in hip-hop music.

In 1988, the group was signed to Def Jam Records and late in that year they released their first and only album, Straight From the Basement of Kooley High! on Def Jam. The album featured a cameo by Beastie Boys member, Mike D. on the track "She's Got a Moustache". The album featured samples from The Jackson 5, The Fat Boys, Run DMC, and P-Funk.

Where are they now 
The members of the group were generally more successful in their subsequent solo careers as television personalities and radio DJs, than they were as a hip-hop group.
Doctor Dré – went on to become a DJ for the Beastie Boys, a host for Yo! MTV Raps, and a hip-hop radio host with Ed Lover.
T Money – was a host for Yo! MTV Raps. T Money has developed his own promotion, management, and marketing company, T450 Style & Launch, and continues to pursue musical and press opportunities under his stage moniker.
Doctor Dre, T-Money and Rapper G wrote the song "Proud to be Black", on the 1986 album, Raising Hell for Run-DMC.
Rapper Gee, also known as Gerald Gray, went into producing photography at GD Gray Artworks.
Easy G Rockwell – unknown

Discography 

Songwriting credits included Andre Brown / Gerald Gray / Tyrone Kelsie.

References 

1986 establishments in New York (state)
African-American musical groups
Def Jam Recordings artists
East Coast hip hop groups
Musical groups established in 1986
People from Long Island